Boda bodas are bicycles and motorcycle taxis commonly found in East Africa. While motorcycle taxis like boda bodas are present throughout Africa and beyond, the term boda boda is specific to East Africa. In Kenya, they are more frequently called piki pikis. Their ubiquitous presence in East African cities is the result of a number of factors including an increasing demand for public transit, the ability to purchase motorcycles on credit, and an influx of cheap imports from Indian manufacturers like Bajaj. In the countries where they are present, boda bodas can provide transportation options to riders and job opportunities to drivers while at the same time resulting in an increase in road hazards and collisions and unnecessary injuries and deaths.

Etymology
A BBC journalist imagined its origin to be onomatopoeia.

A competing suggestion is that the boda boda had an apocryphal ability to transport people across a border without a need to complete the paperwork using a motor vehicle would necessitate; i.e. from border to border.

Number in operation
While there is no doubt boda bodas are commonplace in East African cities like Kampala and Nairobi, estimates of their number vary.

Dar es Salaam
Figures show a substantial increase (nearly 10,000%) of motorcycle imports to Tanzania from 2003 to 2015.

Kampala

In 2013, one source claims 300,000 were operating in Kampala, Uganda. Data from the Kampala Capital City Authority show 120,000 registered motorcycles in the city around the same time although the number of boda bodas could be higher as some are unregistered according to a representative of the Kampala Boda-boda Riders Association. The same source indicated in 2015 that around 40,000 were operating in central Kampala. Another knowledgeable source suggested in 2015 that the true figure is closer to double that number.

Across Uganda riding boda bodas has become a substantial source of income for many youths, providing livelihood to thousands of families in the country. In Kampala, the business has attracted tour and travel investors with one company 'Uganda Adventure Safaris and Boda Boda Tours' providing city maneuver as one of their exciting tour packages for many visitors and tourists in Kampala.

Kigali
Unlike in most other cities, motorcycle taxi drivers in Kigali, Rwanda, are generally registered and considered law-abiding. Here, the preferred term for this form of transport is moto.

Potential shift from Boda Boda to bicycles for sustainability reasons
In a study conducted in Mukono, Uganda among students, researchers determined that four factors have possible implications for bicycling. These factors were: the transport system and safety factors, the natural environmental factors, the perceptions of cycling that an individual has, and the demographic characteristics of said individual. A logistic model of the factors likely to cause commuters to change modes to bicycles also highlighted mainly demographic characteristics (age, gender, and the individual's ability to cycle) as predictors of the individual's shift in mode to bicycles. These findings suggested that transport system improvements that could reduce the perceived risks of cycling, could perhaps have some of the greatest benefits to cycling in Uganda .

Ridesharing services

SafeBoda
SafeBoda is a ridesharing company for motorcycle taxis providing safe and efficient boda boda rides for those in need of quick travel across several cities in Africa. The startup was founded in November 2014 by Maxime Dieudonne, Rapa Thomson Ricky and Alastair Sussock. In 2014, the motorcycle taxis had their greatest popularity globally in Uganda, with over 80,000 riding the streets of Kampala and that was where SafeBoda was begun. Speaking with CNN, Alastair Sussock said they wanted to seize upon Uganda's burgeoning young population which had relatively easy access to fast internet and smartphones. SafeBoda launched operations in Nairobi, Kenya in 2017 and in 2019 they forayed into Nigeria's Ibadan. SafeBoda provides training and helmets to drivers who access fares through its app. Their community of drivers all receive extensive training in road safety, first aid, and bike maintenance in partnership with The Red Cross to make them safe and professional while driving on the streets. SafeBoda drivers are equipped with hygiene hairnets and a spare DOT-Certified helmet for their customers. All SafeBoda drivers are identifiable and trackable through their system.

Safe Motos
SafeMotos was launched in Kigali, Rwanda and has expanded to the DR Congo.

Bolt
Bolt launched boda boda ridesharing services in Uganda to complement its e-taxi services. It has however suffered criticisms about poor service delivery and threatened the termination of their services in February 2019.

Uber Boda
Uber also added their e-boda services in Uganda in March 2018 and operates in Kampala.

Bob Eco
Bob Eco launched their e-boda in 2020 in Uganda and exapnded to DR Congo, Senegal, South Africa and Ivory Coast

Gallery

See also
Motorcycle taxi
Okada (motorcycle taxi)

External links
 The Boda-boda Boom. BBC. The Documentary.
 The Big Boda Boda Book.

References

Utility cycling
Cycle types
Road transport in Africa
Road transport in Kenya
Road transport in Uganda
Taxi vehicles
Motorcycle taxis